Selaković is a Serbian surname. It may refer to:

Stefan Selaković (born 1977), Swedish former footballer
Nikola Selaković (born 1983), Serbian politician
Nikola Selaković (born 1995), Serbian rower
Petronije Selaković (fl. 1648), Serbian Orthodox monk and Venetian irregular military commander

Serbian surnames